Silva is a Latvian and Armenian feminine given name. The associated name day in Latvia is October 11.

Notable people named Silva 
Silva Bendrāte (born 1956), Latvian journalist and politician
Silva Golde (1955–2013), Latvian politician and educator
Silva Hakobyan (born 1988), Armenian singer
Silva Kaputikyan (1919–2006), Armenian poet
Sylva Kelegian (born 1962), American actress
Silva Shahakian (born 1985), Iraqi–Armenian beauty pageant titleholder; Miss Iraq 2006

References 

Armenian feminine given names
Latvian feminine given names
Feminine given names